Louis-Pierre Mainville (born ) is a Canadian male volleyball player. He was part of the Canada men's national volleyball team at the 2010 FIVB Volleyball Men's World Championship in Italy. He played for Team Canada.  He currently lives with his wife and two sons in Hamilton, ON.

Clubs
 Team Canada (2010)

References

1986 births
Canadian men's volleyball players
Living people